This is a list of notable top international players of the racquet sport squash.

Names are highlighted in bold if the player has officially been ranked the World No.1; has won the World Open; has been champion at the British Open (which was the effective world championship of the sport prior to the 1970s); has won a singles Gold Medal at the Commonwealth Games; or has been ranked No. 1 on the professional hardball squash circuit.

Men

Women

See also

 Squash
 World Open 
 British Open Squash Championships
 World Doubles Squash Championships 
 World Team Squash Championships
 Hardball squash

References

External links
 World player profiles, Current Squash Player Profiles
 PSA Squash

Squash
Squash players
Players